Elections to Liverpool City Council were held on Wednesday 1 November 1893. One third of the council seats were up for election, the term of office of each councillor being three years.

Four of the sixteen seats were uncontested.

After the election, the composition of the council was:

Election result

Ward results

* - Retiring Councillor seeking re-election

Abercromby

Castle Street

Everton

Exchange

Great George

Lime Street

North Toxteth

Pitt Street

Rodney Street

St. Anne Street

St. Paul's

St. Peter's

Scotland

South Toxteth

Vauxhall

West Derby

By-elections

No. 15, South Toxteth, 20 February 1894

Caused by the resignation of Councillor James De Bels Adam (Conservative, South Toxteth, elected 1 November 1891),  which was reported to the Council on 7 February 1894.

No. 6 Castle Street, 19 June 1894

Caused by the resignation of Councillor Henry Hugh Hornby (Liberal Unionist, Castle Street, elected 1 November 1892), which was reported to the Council on 6 June 1894.

See also

 Liverpool City Council
 Liverpool Town Council elections 1835 - 1879
 Liverpool City Council elections 1880–present
 Mayors and Lord Mayors of Liverpool 1207 to present
 History of local government in England

References

1893
1893 English local elections
November 1893 events
1890s in Liverpool